The 1936 San Diego State Aztecs football team represented San Diego State College during the 1936 NCAA football season.

San Diego State competed in the Southern California Intercollegiate Athletic Conference (SCIAC). The 1936 San Diego State team was led by head coach Leo B. Calland in his second season with the Aztecs. They played home games at the new Aztec Bowl in San Diego, California. Aztec Bowl was constructed as one of nine different Works Progress Administration (WPA) projects on the San Diego State campus. The Aztecs finished the season as champion of the SCIAC, with six wins, one loss and one tie (6–1–1, 5–0 SCIAC). Overall, the team scored 118 points for the season while giving up 62.

Schedule

Team players in the NFL
No San Diego State players were selected in the 1937 NFL Draft.

Notes

References

San Diego State
San Diego State Aztecs football seasons
Southern California Intercollegiate Athletic Conference football champion seasons
San Diego State Aztecs football